John de Burnham (died 1363) was an English-born cleric, judge and Crown official who spent much of his career in Ireland. He held office as Lord High Treasurer of Ireland and Chief Baron of the Irish Exchequer. He spent many years trying to clear himself of charges of corruption, which seem to have been the invention of malicious colleagues.

Early life

He was the son of William Burnham of Norfolk, and was probably born in one of the groups of adjacent villages called the Norfolk Burnhams. He took holy orders, and his first benefice was a living in Lincolnshire. He became parish priest of Felmersham, Bedfordshire in 1333 and was named as a tax assessor for the same county, and also for Buckinghamshire, in 1340. He was a member of the Royal Household from the 1320s onwards, and gained great experience in the field of finance, especially in army accounts.

 Church of St Mary, Felmersham, Bedfordshire: Burnham was the parish priest here in the 1330s.

Lord Treasurer of Ireland

In 1343 he was sent to Ireland as Lord Treasurer; he also became a canon of St. Patrick's Cathedral, Dublin and a prebendary of the Diocese of Cloyne. His appointment as Treasurer, like that of Sir Ralph d'Ufford as Justiciar of Ireland a few years earlier, was apparently connected with complaints by the Privy Council of Ireland about the efficiency of the Irish Exchequer, and the Council's doubts about the honesty of Burnham's predecessor Hugh de Burgh. It was no doubt thought that Burnham, with his long experience of administering the English royal finances, would be a good Treasurer; but it is difficult to determine what, if anything, he achieved, and his long battle to clear himself of charges of corruption can hardly have made the task of reforming the Irish Exchequer any easier. He was ex officio a member of the Privy Council. He returned to England on official business in 1345. In 1346 he was present at the Council meeting which approved the appointment of Ralph Darcy as Justiciar of Ireland.

When the lands of Maurice FitzGerald, 1st Earl of Desmond, were forfeited for rebellion in 1345, Burnham was chosen to administer them.

Charges of corruption

In 1348 he was summoned to England to answer very serious charges as to his record as Treasurer, involving accusations of fraud, negligence and concealment of the royal revenues for his own profit. His stay in England lasted for seven years, requiring him to appoint attorneys to manage his Irish affairs. The charges appear to have been instigated by  William de Barton, a disgruntled official in the Exchequer of Ireland with a personal grudge against Burnham, who may have been responsible for Barton's temporary removal from office on health grounds. Barton belonged to a rival faction in the Dublin administration and played a large part in the subsequent inquiry; he also received a substantial grant of Crown lands at this time, probably at Milltown, Dublin. There is no evidence that Burnham was regarded by the rest of his colleagues as corrupt, although some of them stood to gain from the charges, notably Robert de Emeldon, who succeeded him as Treasurer, and was supportive of Barton, whose return to the Exchequer he facilitated.

In the end, Burnham was cleared of any wrongdoing. While the accusations against him were numerous and detailed, Connolly concludes that there is no credible evidence to support any of them and that the charges were fabricated by Burnham's rival William de Barton. Although Barton, given the lack of evidence to support them, could not hope to prove the charges, he could hope that the length and complexity of the inquiry, which he himself dragged out as far as possible, would cause Burnham a great deal of time and trouble.

Last years

Having vindicated his good name, Burnham returned to Ireland to take up the office of Lord Chief Baron in 1355. He remained in office until his death in 1363. He and his former enemy William de Barton, who had been restored to office, on Emeldon's recommendation, as Chief Engrosser of the Exchequer, appear to have resolved their differences, and they worked amicably together in the Court of Exchequer for several years.

References

1363 deaths
People from King's Lynn and West Norfolk (district)
Year of birth unknown
People from Felmersham
Chief Barons of the Irish Exchequer
Lord High Treasurers of Ireland